Ben Hansen Park is an urban park located in and administered by the city of Wisconsin Rapids, Wisconsin.

It is adjacent to Lyon Park. Ben Hansen Park was named after Benjamin Hansen, who was credited with beautifying the local riverbanks.

References

Geography of Wood County, Wisconsin
Parks in Wisconsin
Wisconsin Rapids, Wisconsin